The Revue philosophique de la France et de l'étranger is an academic journal founded by Théodule-Armand Ribot in 1876. It was continued by Lucien Lévy-Bruhl, Emile Bréhier, Paul Masson-Oursel, and Pierre-Maxime Schuhl. Originally published monthly, it became fortnightly for 30 years, and finally quarterly. It is currently edited by Yvon Brès and Dominique Merllié and published by Presses universitaires de France.

See also 
 List of philosophy journals

External links 
 
 Complete issues, 1876-1938

Philosophy journals
French-language journals
Publications established in 1876
Quarterly journals
1876 establishments in France